Dilağarda or Dilagarda or Dilagorda or Dulagarda may refer to:
Araz Dilagarda, Azerbaijan
Dilağarda, Beylagan, Azerbaijan
Dilağarda, Fizuli, Azerbaijan
Qobu Dilağarda, Azerbaijan